Andrew or Andy Walters may refer to:

Sports
Andrew Walters (Canadian football); see 1994 CFL Draft
Andrew Walters (bowls)
Andy Walters (footballer) for St. Peters Strikers FC

Others
Andrew Walters, character in Annie-for-Spite
Andrew Walters (composer); see Electronic Music Midwest
Andy Walters (musician); see Fiction Plane

See also
Andrew Waters (disambiguation)
Andrew Walter, American businessman and former quarterback